"It's Only Rock and Roll" is an episode of the BBC sitcom, Only Fools and Horses. It was the fourth episode of series 4, and was first broadcast on 14 March 1985. In the episode, Rodney joins an aspiring rock band. The episode is set around Saint Patrick's Day.

Synopsis
At a warehouse, as Del Boy loads up the van with the latest item to flog called Kandy Dolls, Rodney tells him that he just joined a band that are styling themselves on Frankie Goes to Hollywood. Del points out that Rodney does not have any drums, as well as mention that he should not be around that "bunch of wallies", especially their wild lead singer, "Mental" Mickey Maguire, who once bit another man's ear off. It is then revealed that each Kandy Doll has a different voice chip meant for another toy, and the Trotter Brothers then drive off.

Later, back at Nelson Mandela House, Del tells Albert that the Shamrock Club in Deptford, the "Paddies' Moulin Rouge", has no act for St. Patrick's Night since their resident band, the Dublin Bay Stormers, are in prison for their violent behaviour. Del manages to secure a booking for Rodney's band at the Shamrock Club with a clever ruse which involves a carefully timed slamming door and a Bachelors LP on the record player, then calling Liam, the owner of the club on the phone, and telling him that it will require £300 to hire the band for St. Patrick's Night. Once the conversation is over, Del heads off to the community hall to tell Rodney.

That night, at the community hall, Rodney and his band are rehearsing a song they wrote called "Boys will be Boys", with Mental Mickey providing lead vocals, two other men named Stew and Charlie both playing rhythm guitars, and Rodney playing drums on packing cases, until Del enters, listens to the band playing their song rather badly, then tells them that he wants to be their manager and will buy them brand new instruments, as well as get them bookings. Mental Mickey allows Del to take the position. Del then asks the band if they know any of the Bachelors' songs, and the band look at him nonplussed. Now their manager, Del promises the band that this time next year, they will be millionaires, only to walk out of the hall and then laughing at how poor the band are.

On St. Patrick's Night at the Shamrock Club, a riot has broken out due to the performance of Rodney's band. Rodney, Del, Stew, and Charlie exit the club with their instruments and escape in the Trotter van, while Mental Mickey enjoys himself fighting various club patrons.

A few days later, at the Trotters' garage, Rodney has invited a policeman in to tell him that his band's instruments were "stolen". But Del appears at the garage door and explains to his younger brother and the policeman that he had them on a sale-or-return basis, much to Rodney's surprise. Del gets rid of the policeman, and tells Rodney that the band were never destined for the Albert Hall and Carnegie Hall; the only hall they were destined for was "Sod 'All". After explaining that he was sacked from the band for defending his older brother, Rodney asks Del why he always interferes in everything his younger brother does. Del answers that their mother Joan said to him on her deathbed to give Rodney all the encouragement he could, but Rodney points out that whatever they are arguing about, their mother always had something to say about it on her deathbed, such as a drunk Del telling Rodney to go and get fish and chips because Joan said "Send Rodney for the fish". Del then pays Rodney his share of the £300 booking fee, and tells him to just forget about Mental Mickey's group and move on. With the conversation over, the Trotter Brothers venture to the market to flog hooky Maltesers.

One evening some time later, as Del is talking to Monkey Harris on the telephone about the Kandy Dolls, he watches the TVs and discovers to his complete horror that the group, now named A Bunch of Wallies and having hired a new drummer, are at #26 on the UK Singles Chart and performing their song on Top of the Pops. Suddenly, Del hears Rodney entering the flat, and quickly turns both TVs off, as Rodney wants to watch Top of the Pops, but Del tells him that both televisions are broken. And so, Rodney decides to enter Albert's bedroom and annoy him about taking an old woman from a laundromat to an old folks' beano. While that happens, Del quickly puts on his camel coat, while Albert exits his bedroom and tells him that Rodney's busy watching Top of the Pops on the portable TV. Just as Del is about to escape, a fuming Rodney exits Albert's bedroom and tells Del that Mental Mickey and his band are in the charts and are likely to reach #1, and Rodney has lost out on it. Del protests that he too has lost out as he was the band's manager. Rodney produces his old drumstick and threatens to hurt Del with it.

Episode cast

Music
 The Bachelors: "Diane"
 Shakatak: "Toot The Shoot"
 Daniel Peacock: "Drivin' Hard, Boys Will Be Boys"

External links

Only Fools and Horses (series 4) episodes
1985 British television episodes
Saint Patrick's Day television episodes